Leptotrophon segmentatus is a species of sea snail, a marine gastropod mollusk in the family Muricidae, the murex snails or rock snails.

Description
The shell grows to a length of 9 mm.

Distribution
This marine species occurs off Southern Australia and Tasmania.

References

External links
  Verco, J.C. 1909. ''Notes on South Australian marine Mollusca with descriptions of new species. Part XII; Transactions of the Royal Society of South Australia v. 33 (1909)
 Houart, R.; Héros, V. (2012). New species of Muricidae (Gastropoda) and additional or noteworthy records from the western Pacific. Zoosystema. 34(1), 21-37

Leptotrophon
Gastropods described in 1909